The 5th Annual Shorty Awards ceremony featured Felicia Day, James Urbaniak, Kristian Nairn, Hannibal Buress, Carrie Keagan, Chris Hardwick, David Karp and Coco Rocha. 2.4 million tweeted nominations were made across all the categories to honor the top users on Twitter, Facebook, Tumblr, Foursquare, YouTube and other internet sites.

The ceremony took place on April 8, 2013 at the New York TimesCenter and was hosted by Actress Felicia Day. The show began with videos of Felicia Day exploring NYC's internet culture as well as Mayor Michael Bloomberg welcoming the audience with Internet-speak. During the night, Wolf Blitzer announced early poll results of what's trending during the Shorty Awards, and Jimmy Kimmel was given the Lifetime Achievement Award.

The audience was also shown an interview of the Mars Curiosity Rover, led by comedian and actor Seth Green, before accepting the Shorty Award for Foursquare Mayor of the Year.

Fifth Annual Influencer Winners by category

Fifth Annual Brand Winners by category

Special Awards

References 

Shorty Awards
2013 in Internet culture